Sarah Connor may refer to:

 Sarah Connor (singer), German pop and R&B singer
 Sarah Connor (album), 2004 album by the singer above
 Sarah Connor (Terminator), fictional character in the Terminator movie franchise
 Terminator: The Sarah Connor Chronicles, television series featuring the above fictional character

See also

 
 
 Sarah O'Connor, American molecular biologist
 Sarah (disambiguation)
 Connor (disambiguation)